This is a list of reptiles of the Democratic Republic of the Congo by family and order. It lists all families and species of reptiles in the Democratic Republic of the Congo.

The list below follows Donald George Broadley's 1998 "The reptilian fauna of the Democratic Republic of the Congo (Congo-Kinshasa)", and the Reptile Database.



There are 336 species of reptiles (class Reptilia), in 109 genera, in 22 families, in 5 orders, in the Democratic Republic of the Congo. Some are presumed to occur in the DRC, because they have been found in neighboring areas, but have not yet been found in DRC (see comment after name).

Order Amphisbaenia - amphisbaenids
10 species in 4 genera in 1 family

Family Amphisbaenidae – amphisbaenid or legless lizards, 10 species in 4 genera:
Dalophia gigantea (Peracca, 1903) 
Dalophia luluae (De Witte & Laurent, 1942) 
Monopeltis adercae De Witte, 1953 
Monopeltis guentheri Boulenger, 1885 
Monopeltis kabindae De Witte & Laurent, 1942 
Monopeltis remaclei De Witte, 1933 
Monopeltis scalper (Günther, 1876) 
Monopeltis schoutedeni De Witte, 1933 
Monopeltis vanderysti De Witte, 1922 
Zygaspis quadrifrons (Peters, 1862)

Order Crocodylia - crocodiles
3 species in 3 genera in 1 family

Family Crocodylidae – true crocodiles, 3 species in 3 genera:
Crocodylus niloticus Laurenti, 1768
Mecistops cataphractus (Cuvier, 1825)
Osteolaemus tetraspis Cope, 1861

Order Sauria - lizards
120 species in 35 genera in 8 families

Family Agamidae - 4 species in 2 genera:
Acanthocercus atricollis (Smith, 1849) 
Agama agama (Linnaeus, 1758) 
Agama anchietae Bocage, 1896
Agama armata Peters, 1855
Family Chamaeleonidae - 20 species in 4 genera:
Chamaeleo anchietae Bocage, 1872 
Chamaeleo dilepis Leach, 1819 
Chamaeleo gracilis Hallowell, 1844 
Chamaeleo laevigatus (Gray, 1863) 
Chamaeleo quilensis Bocage, 1866
Chamaeleo roperi (Boulenger, 1890)
Kinyongia adolfifriderici (Sternfeld, 1912) 
Kinyongia carpenteri (Parker, 1929) 
Kinyongia xenorhina (Boulenger, 1901) 
Rhampholeon boulengeri Steindachner, 1911 
Rhampholeon spectrum (Buchholz, 1874) possibly in (W) DRC
Trioceros bitaeniatus (Fischer, 1884) 
Trioceros chapini (De Witte, 1964) 
Trioceros cristatus (Stutchbury, 1837) possibly in (W) DRC
Trioceros ellioti (Günther, 1895) 
Trioceros ituriensis (Schmidt, 1919) 
Trioceros johnstoni (Boulenger, 1901) 
Trioceros oweni (Gray, 1831) 
Trioceros rudis (Boulenger, 1906) 
Trioceros schoutedeni (Laurent, 1952)
Family Cordylidae - 4 species in 2 genera:
Chamaesaura anguina (Linnaeus, 1758) 
Chamaesaura macrolepis (Cope, 1862) 
Cordylus angolensis (Bocage, 1895) possibly in (S) DRC
Cordylus tropidosternum (Cope, 1869)
Family Gekkonidae - 21 species in 5 genera:
Cnemaspis dickersonae (Schmidt, 1919) 
Cnemaspis quattuorseriata (Sternfeld, 1912) 
Elasmodactylus tuberculosus Boulenger, 1895 
Hemidactylus brookii Gray, 1845 
Hemidactylus echinus O'Shaughnessy, 1875 
Hemidactylus fasciatus Gray, 1842 
Hemidactylus longicephalus Bocage, 1873 
Hemidactylus mabouia (Moreau De Jonnès, 1818) 
Hemidactylus muriceus Peters, 1870 
Hemidactylus pseudomuriceus Henle & Böhme, 2003 possibly in (W) DRC
Hemidactylus richardsonii (Gray, 1845) 
Lygodactylus angolensis Bocage, 1896 
Lygodactylus angularis Günther, 1893 
Lygodactylus capensis (Smith, 1849) 
Lygodactylus depressus Schmidt, 1919 
Lygodactylus fischeri Boulenger, 1890 possibly, but not reported, in (W) DRC
Lygodactylus gutturalis (Bocage, 1873) 
Lygodactylus picturatus (Peters, 1871)
Pachydactylus capensis (Smith, 1846) 
Pachydactylus katanganus De Witte, 1953
Pachydactylus punctatus Peters, 1854
Family Gerrhosauridae - 5 species in 2 genera:
Gerrhosaurus bulsi Laurent, 1954
Gerrhosaurus major Duméril, 1851 
Gerrhosaurus multilineatus Bocage, 1866 
Gerrhosaurus nigrolineatus Hallowell, 1857 
Tetradactylus ellenbergeri (Angel, 1922)
Family Lacertidae - 13 species in 7 genera:
Adolfus africanus (Boulenger, 1906) 
Adolfus jacksoni (Boulenger, 1899) 
Adolfus vauereselli (Tornier, 1902) 
Gastropholis echinata (Cope, 1862) 
Gastropholis tropidopholis (Boulenger, 1916) 
Heliobolus nitida (Günther, 1872) 
Holaspis guentheri Gray, 1863 
Holaspis laevis Werner, 1895 
Ichnotropis bivittata Bocage, 1866 
Ichnotropis capensis (Smith, 1838) 
Ichnotropis chapini Schmidt, 1919 
Latastia johnstonii Boulenger, 1907 
Poromera fordii (Hallowell, 1857)
Family Scincidae - 49 species in 12 genera:
Afroablepharus seydeli (De Witte, 1933) 
Eumecia anchietae Bocage, 1870 
Feylinia currori Gray, 1845 
Feylinia elegans (Hallowell, 1852) probably in DRC
Feylinia macrolepis Boettger, 1887 possibly in (N, W) DRC
Lacertaspis reichenowii (Peters, 1874) 
Lacertaspis rohdei (Müller, 1910) possibly in (W) DRC
Lepidothyris fernandi (Burton, 1836) possibly in (S) DRC
Lepidothyris hinkeli Wagner, Böhme, Pauwels & Schmitz, 2009
Lepidothyris striatus (Hallowell, 1854) possibly in (W) DRC
Leptosiaphos aloysiisabaudiae (Peracca, 1907) 
Leptosiaphos blochmanni (Tornier, 1903) 
Leptosiaphos dewittei (Loveridge, 1934) 
Leptosiaphos graueri (Sternfeld, 1912) 
Leptosiaphos hackarsi (De Witte, 1941) 
Leptosiaphos hylophilus Laurent, 1982 
Leptosiaphos luberoensis (De Witte, 1933) 
Leptosiaphos meleagris (Boulenger, 1907) 
Leptosiaphos rhodurus Laurent, 1952 
Lygosoma guineensis (Peters, 1879) probably in DRC
Lygosoma sundevalli (Smith, 1849) 
Melanoseps ater (Günther, 1873) 
Melanoseps occidentalis (Peters, 1877) 
Mochlus afer (Peters, 1854) 
Panaspis breviceps (Peters, 1873) 
Panaspis burgeoni (De Witte, 1933) 
Panaspis cabindae (Bocage, 1866) 
Panaspis helleri (Loveridge, 1932) 
Panaspis kitsoni (Boulenger, 1913) 
Panaspis quattuordigitata (Sternfeld, 1912) 
Panaspis tancredii (Boulenger, 1909) 
Panaspis wahlbergii (Smith, 1849) 
Sepsina angolensis Bocage, 1866 
Sepsina bayoni (Bocage, 1866) 
Sepsina tetradactyla Peters, 1874 
Trachylepis acutilabris (Peters, 1862) 
Trachylepis affinis (Gray, 1838) possibly in (W) DRC
Trachylepis albilabris (Hallowell, 1857) 
Trachylepis buettneri (Matschie, 1893) 
Trachylepis ivensii (Bocage, 1879) 
Trachylepis maculilabris (Gray, 1845) 
Trachylepis megalura (Peters, 1878) 
Trachylepis perrotetii (Duméril & Bibron, 1839) 
Trachylepis planifrons (Peters, 1878) 
Trachylepis polytropis (Boulenger, 1903) 
Trachylepis pulcherrima De Witte, 1953
Trachylepis quinquetaeniata (Lichtenstein, 1823) 
Trachylepis striata (Peters, 1844) 
Trachylepis varia (Peters, 1867)
Family Varanidae - 4 species in 1 genus:
Varanus albigularis (Daudin, 1802) 
Varanus exanthematicus (Bosc, 1792) 
Varanus niloticus (Linnaeus, 1758) 
Varanus ornatus (Daudin, 1803)

Order Serpentes - snakes
182 species in 59 genera in 8 families

Family Atractaspididae - 28 species in 7 genera:
Amblyodipsas katangensis De Witte & Laurent, 1942 
Amblyodipsas polylepis (Bocage, 1873) 
Amblyodipsas rodhaini (De Witte, 1930) 
Amblyodipsas unicolor (Reinhardt, 1843) 
Aparallactus capensis Smith, 1849 
Aparallactus lunulatus (Peters, 1854) 
Aparallactus modestus (Günther, 1859) 
Aparallactus moeruensis De Witte & Laurent, 1943 
Atractaspis aterrima Günther, 1863 
Atractaspis battersbyi De Witte, 1959 
Atractaspis bibronii Smith, 1849 
Atractaspis boulengeri Mocquard, 1897 
Atractaspis congica Peters, 1877 
Atractaspis corpulenta (Hallowell, 1854) 
Atractaspis irregularis (Reinhardt, 1843) 
Atractaspis reticulata Sjöstedt, 1896 
Chilorhinophis gerardi (Boulenger, 1913) 
Hypoptophis wilsoni Boulenger, 1908 
Polemon bocourti Mocquard, 1897 
Polemon christyi (Boulenger, 1903) 
Polemon collaris (Peters, 1881) 
Polemon fulvicollis (Mocquard, 1887) 
Polemon gabonensis (Duméril, 1856) 
Polemon notatus (Peters, 1882) 
Polemon robustus De Witte & Laurent, 1947 
Xenocalamus bicolor Günther, 1868 
Xenocalamus mechowii Peters, 1881 
Xenocalamus michellii Müller, 1911
Family Boidae - 3 species in 2 genera:
Calabaria reinhardtii (Schlegel, 1848) 
Python regius (Shaw, 1802) 
Python sebae (Gmelin, 1789)
Family Colubridae - 98 species in 36 genera:
Bothrolycus ater Günther, 1874 
Bothrophthalmus brunneus Günther, 1863 possibly in (W) DRC
Bothrophthalmus lineatus (Peters, 1863) 
Buhoma depressiceps (Werner, 1897) 
Chamaelycus christyi Boulenger, 1919 
Chamaelycus fasciatus (Günther, 1858) 
Chamaelycus parkeri (Angel, 1934) 
Chamaelycus werneri (Mocquard, 1902) possibly in (W) DRC
Crotaphopeltis hotamboeia (Laurenti, 1768) 
Dasypeltis atra Sternfeld, 1912 
Dasypeltis fasciata Smith, 1849 
Dasypeltis scabra (Linnaeus, 1758) 
Dendrolycus elapoides (Günther, 1874) 
Dipsadoboa duchesnii (Boulenger, 1901) 
Dipsadoboa shrevei (Loveridge, 1932) 
Dipsadoboa unicolor Günther, 1858 
Dipsadoboa viridis (Peters, 1869) 
Dipsadoboa weileri (Lindholm, 1905) 
Dispholidus typus (Smith, 1828) 
Duberria lutrix (Linnaeus, 1758) 
Duberria shirana (Boulenger, 1894)
Gonionotophis brussauxi (Mocquard, 1889) 
Grayia caesar (Günther, 1863) 
Grayia ornata Bocage, 1866 
Grayia smithii (Leach, 1818) 
Grayia tholloni Mocquard, 1897 
Hapsidophrys lineatus Fischer, 1856 
Hapsidophrys smaragdina (Schlegel, 1837) 
Helophis schoutedeni (De Witte, 1942) 
Hemirhagerrhis nototaenia (Günther, 1864) 
Hormonotus modestus (Duméril, Bibron & Duméril, 1854) 
Hydraethiops melanogaster Günther, 1872 
Lamprophis fuliginosus (Boie, 1827) 
Lamprophis lineatus (Duméril, Bibron & Duméril, 1854) 
Lamprophis olivaceus (Duméril, 1856) 
Lamprophis virgatus (Hallowell, 1854) 
Limnophis bangweolicus Mertens, 1936 
Limnophis bicolor Günther, 1865 
Lycodonomorphus bicolor (Günther, 1893) 
Lycodonomorphus leleupi (Laurent, 1950) 
Lycodonomorphus subtaeniatus Laurent, 1954 
Lycophidion capense (Smith, 1831) 
Lycophidion hellmichi Laurent, 1964 
Lycophidion irroratum (Leach, 1819) 
Lycophidion laterale Hallowell, 1857 
Lycophidion meleagris (Boulenger, 1893) 
Lycophidion multimaculatum (Boettger, 1888) 
Lycophidion ornatum Parker, 1936 
Mehelya capensis (Smith, 1847) 
Mehelya guirali (Mocquard, 1887) 
Mehelya laurenti De Witte, 1959 
Mehelya nyassae (Günther, 1888) 
Mehelya poensis (Smith, 1849) 
Mehelya stenophthalmus (Mocquard, 1887) 
Meizodon coronatus (Schlegel, 1837) 
Meizodon regularis Fischer, 1856 
Natriciteres bipostocularis Broadley, 1962
Natriciteres fuliginoides (Günther, 1858) 
Natriciteres olivacea (Peters, 1854) 
Natriciteres variegata (Peters, 1861) 
Philothamnus angolensis Bocage, 1882 
Philothamnus bequaerti (Schmidt, 1923) 
Philothamnus carinatus (Andersson, 1901) 
Philothamnus dorsalis (Bocage, 1866) 
Philothamnus heterodermus (Hallowell, 1857) 
Philothamnus heterolepidotus (Günther, 1863) 
Philothamnus hoplogaster (Günther, 1863) 
Philothamnus hughesi Trape & Roux-Esteve, 1990 
Philothamnus irregularis Leach, 1819 
Philothamnus nitidus (Günther, 1863) 
Philothamnus ornatus Bocage, 1872 
Philothamnus semivariegatus (Smith, 1840) 
Prosymna ambigua Bocage, 1873 
Prosymna meleagris (Reinhardt, 1843) 
Psammophis angolensis (Bocage, 1872) 
Psammophis jallae Peracca, 1896 
Psammophis lineatus (Duméril, Bibron & Duméril, 1854) 
Psammophis mossambicus Peters, 1882
Psammophis phillipsi (Hallowell, 1844) 
Psammophis sibilans (Linnaeus, 1758) 
Psammophis subtaeniatus Peters, 1881 
Psammophis zambiensis Hughes, 2002
Psammophylax acutus (Günther, 1888) 
Psammophylax tritaeniatus (Günther, 1868) 
Psammophylax variabilis Günther, 1893 
Pseudaspis cana (Linnaeus, 1758) 
Rhamnophis aethiopissa Günther, 1862 
Rhamnophis batesii (Boulenger, 1908) 
Rhamphiophis oxyrhynchus (Reinhardt, 1843) 
Rhamphiophis rostratus Peters, 1854 
Scaphiophis albopunctatus Peters, 1870 
Telescopus semiannulatus Smith, 1849 
Thelotornis capensis Smith, 1849 
Thelotornis kirtlandii (Hallowell, 1844) 
Thrasops flavigularis (Hallowell, 1852) 
Thrasops jacksonii Günther, 1895 
Toxicodryas blandingii (Hallowell, 1844) 
Toxicodryas pulverulenta (Fischer, 1856)
Family Elapidae - 15 species in 4 genera:
Dendroaspis angusticeps (Smith, 1849) 
Dendroaspis jamesoni (Traill, 1843) 
Dendroaspis polylepis Günther, 1864 
Elapsoidea guentherii Bocage, 1866 
Elapsoidea laticincta (Werner, 1919) 
Elapsoidea loveridgei Parker, 1949 
Elapsoidea semiannulata Bocage, 1882 
Naja annulata (Peters, 1876) 
Naja christyi Boulenger, 1904 
Naja haje (Linnaeus, 1758) 
Naja melanoleuca Hallowell, 1857 
Naja mossambica Peters, 1854
Naja multifasciata (Werner, 1902) 
Naja nigricollis Reinhardt, 1843 
Pseudohaje goldii (Boulenger, 1895)
Family Leptotyphlopidae - 6 species in 3 genera:
Guinea sundewalli (Jan, 1862) possibly in (N, W) DRC
Leptotyphlops conjunctus (Jan, 1861) 
Leptotyphlops emini (Boulenger, 1890) 
Leptotyphlops kafubi (Boulenger, 1919)
Leptotyphlops nigricans (Schlegel, 1839) 
Myriopholis perreti (Roux-Estève, 1979) possibly, but not reported, in (W) DRC
Family Typhlopidae - 17 species in 4 genera:
Afrotyphlops angolensis (Bocage, 1866) 
Afrotyphlops congestus (Duméril & Bibron, 1844) 
Afrotyphlops lineolatus Jan, 1864 probably in (E) DRC
Afrotyphlops punctatus (Leach, 1819) 
Afrotyphlops schmidti (Laurent, 1956) 
Afrotyphlops steinhausi Werner, 1909 
Letheobia caeca (Duméril, 1856) 
Letheobia gracilis (Sternfeld, 1910) 
Letheobia graueri (Sternfeld, 1912) 
Letheobia kibarae (De Witte, 1953) 
Letheobia rufescens (Chabanaud, 1916) 
Letheobia sudanensis (Schmidt, 1923) 
Letheobia wittei (Roux-Estève, 1974) 
Megatyphlops mucruso (Peters, 1854)
Megatyphlops schlegelii (Bianconi, 1847) 
Rhinotyphlops praeocularis (Stejneger, 1894) 
Rhinotyphlops stejnegeri (Loveridge, 1931)
Family Viperidae - 13 species in 3 genera:
Atheris hispida Laurent, 1955 
Atheris katangensis De Witte, 1953 
Atheris nitschei Tornier, 1902 
Atheris squamigera (Hallowell, 1854) 
Bitis arietans (Merrem, 1820) 
Bitis gabonica (Duméril, Bibron & Duméril, 1854) 
Bitis nasicornis (Shaw, 1802) 
Causus bilineatus Boulenger, 1905 
Causus defilippii (Jan, 1862) 
Causus lichtensteinii (Jan, 1859) 
Causus maculatus (Hallowell, 1842) 
Causus resimus (Peters, 1862) 
Causus rhombeatus (Lichtenstein, 1823)

Order Testudines - turtles
22 species in 8 genera in 5 families

Family Cheloniidae - 1 species:
Chelonia mydas (Linnaeus, 1758)
Family Dermochelyidae - 1 species:
Dermochelys coriacea (Vandelli, 1761)
Family Pelomedusidae - 13 species in 2 genera:
Pelomedusa subrufa (Bonnaterre, 1789)
Pelusios bechuanicus Fitzsimons, 1932 
Pelusios carinatus Laurent, 1956 
Pelusios castaneus (Schweigger, 1812) 
Pelusios chapini Laurent, 1965 
Pelusios gabonensis (Duméril, 1856) 
Pelusios nanus Laurent, 1956 
Pelusios  (Duméril & Bibron, 1835) probably in DRC
Pelusios rhodesianus Hewitt, 1927 
Pelusios sinuatus (Smith, 1838) 
Pelusios subniger (Lacépède, 1789) 
Pelusios upembae Broadley, 1981 
Pelusios williamsi Laurent, 1965
Family Testudinidae - 5 species in 2 genera:
Kinixys belliana Gray, 1831 
Kinixys erosa (Schweigger, 1812) 
Kinixys homeana Bell, 1827 
Kinixys spekii Gray, 1863 
Stigmochelys pardalis (Bell, 1828)
Family Trionychidae - 2 species in 2 genera:
Cycloderma aubryi (Duméril, 1856)
Trionyx triunguis (Forskål, 1775)

See also
 Reptile
 List of reptiles
 List of birds of the Democratic Republic of Congo
 List of mammals of the Democratic Republic of the Congo
 List of amphibians of the Democratic Republic of the Congo

Sources 

 Broadley, D. G. (1998). "The reptilian fauna of the Democratic Republic of the Congo (Congo-Kinshasa)". In: Schmidt, K. P. and Noble, G. K. Contributions to the Herpetology of the Belgian Congo. (reprint of the 1919 and 1923 papers). SSAR Facsimile reprints in Herpetology, 780 pp.
 Uetz, P. et al. (eds) The Reptile Database (formerly the EMBL/EBI Reptile Database, more recently the TIGR-Reptile Database).

Reptiles
 List
Democratic Republic of the Congo
Democratic Republic of the Congo